Arrested Development was a short-lived British radio programme that aired from May to June 2000. There were four half-hour episodes and it was broadcast on BBC Radio 4. It starred Letitia Dean and Susannah Doyle. The show was written by Simon Warne and produced by Tracey Neale.

Episodes

Episode 1
Penny and Dave are to get married however the day proves full of problems; with Penny's hair being one of them.

Episode 2
Penny's sister Kate must help her come to terms with Dave jilting her on the wedding day.

Episode 3
Kate's cottage is left ruined after she hires an over-enthusiastic builder.

Episode 4
Bob attempts to woo Kate back, while Penny contemplates the future after her relationship broke down.

References

BBC Radio 4 programmes
2000 radio programme debuts